Eriogonum ampullaceum is a species of wild buckwheat known by the common name Mono buckwheat.

Description
Eriogonum ampullaceum is an annual herb. The leaves are located about the base of the flowering stem. They are generally rounded, woolly in texture, and just a few centimeters wide.

It produces a yellow-green or reddish spindly, branching inflorescence up to 30 centimeters tall. The white flowers are less than 2 millimeters wide and appear in clusters.

Distribution and habitat 
The plant is native to the western Great Basin region, on the lower eastern Sierra Nevada slopes, and eastwards along the border of California and Nevada.

It grows in Great Basin sagebrush scrub habitats, in sandy soils of high desert and plateau areas.

External links
 Calflora Database: Eriogonum ampullaceum (Mono buckwheat)
Jepson Manual eFlora (TJM2) treatment of Eriogonum ampullaceum
U.C. CalPhotos gallery of Eriogonum ampullaceum (Mono buckwheat)

ampullaceum
Flora of California
Flora of Nevada
Flora of the Great Basin
Flora of the Sierra Nevada (United States)
Natural history of Mono County, California
Taxa named by John Thomas Howell
Flora without expected TNC conservation status